Cephas Matafi (born May 24, 1971) is a Zimbabwean long-distance runner. He competed for his native country at the 1992 Summer Olympics in Barcelona, Spain, where he finished in 58th place (2:26:17) in the men's marathon race. His personal best time is 2:15:14 hours, achieved in 1992.  He is a two-time champion of the Paavo Nurmi Marathon (Turku) in Finland.

Achievements

External links
sports-reference

1971 births
Living people
Zimbabwean male long-distance runners
Athletes (track and field) at the 1992 Summer Olympics
Olympic athletes of Zimbabwe
Athletes (track and field) at the 1994 Commonwealth Games
Commonwealth Games competitors for Zimbabwe